Yogesh Gaur, or Gaud commonly credited as Yogesh, (March 19, 1943 – May 29, 2020), was an Indian writer and lyricist. He was known for his contributions to Bollywood, and possibly his best known works came from the film Anand, songs including Kahin Door Jab Din Dal Jaaye and Zindagi Kaisi Hai Paheli (1971), and also Rajnigandha phool tumhare from the movie Rajnigandha (1974).

Life
Yogesh was born on 19 March 1943 in Lucknow, Uttar Pradesh. He moved to Bombay at the age of 16 looking for work and sought the help of his cousin Yogendra Gaur, who was a screenplay writer. His first break was in 1962, when he wrote six songs for the Bollywood movie Sakhi Robin , including the song "Tum jo aa jao", which was sung by Manna Dey. The song launched his career in Bollywood.
He  worked with some of India's finest directors like Hrishikesh Mukherjee and Basu Chatterjee. He famous Hindi songs included Kahin Door Jab Din Dal Jaaye, Zindagi Kaisi Hai Paheli, Rimjhim gire Saawan, Kai baar yunhi dekha hai from Rajnigandha and Na bole tum na maine kuch kaha from Baaton Baaton Mein. Yogesh also worked in television serials as a writer.

Death 
Yogesh Gaur died in Mumbai on 29 May 2020.

Filmography (partial)
Ek Raat
 Sakhi Robin (1962)
Anand (1971)
Annadata (1972)
Anokha Daan (1972)
Mere Bhaiya (1972)
Us Paar (1974)
Manzilein Aur Bhi Hain (1974)
Rajnigandha (1974)
Mili (1975)
Mazaaq (1975)
Chhoti Si Baat (1976)
Priyatama (1977)
Dillagi (1978)
Hamare Tumhare (1979)
Baaton Baaton Mein (1979)
Manzil (1979)
Jeena Yahan (1979)
Anand Mahal
Apne Paraye (1980)
Kirayedaar
Shaukeen (1982)
Pasand Apni Apni (1983)
Lakhon Ki Baat (1984)
Honeymoon (1992)
Sooraj Mukhi  (1992)
Aaja Meri Jaan (1993)
Chor Aur Chaand (1993)
Kuhaasa
Bewafa Sanam (1995)
Apne Dam Par (1996)
Sssshhh... (2003)
Angrezi Mein Kehte Hain (2018)

References

External links
 
 Interview of Yogesh Screen

1943 births
2020 deaths
Writers from Lucknow
Hindi-language lyricists
Indian lyricists